Manuchekhr Nasrulloyevich Dzhalilov ((), born 27 September 1990) is a Tajik professional football player who currently plays as a forward for FC Istiklol.

Club career
Prior to the start of the 2015 season, Dzhalilov joined reigning Tajik League champions FC Istiklol. At the end of Dzhalilov's first season with FC Istiklol he won the league, earning the League's Top Goalscorer and Player of the Year in the process.

In December 2017, it was rumored Dzhalilov had agreed a one-year contract with Indonesian Liga 1 side Sriwijaya, with Sriwijaya confirming his arrival on 17 December 2017, and Istiklol his departure on 4 January 2018.

Following his release from Persebaya Surabaya at the end of the 2019 season, Dzhalilov featured for Istiklol in their first friendly of 2020, a 2–1 defeat to Kokand 1912 on 9 January 2020.

International career
Dzhalilov was a member of Tajikistan U17 football team at the 2007 FIFA U-17 World Cup, making his senior team debut on 2 September 2011 against Uzbekistan.

Career statistics

Club

International
Statistics accurate as of match played 11 June 2022

Scores and results list Tajikistan's goal tally first.

Honours

Istiklol
 Tajik League: 2015, 2016, 2017, 2020, 2021, 2022
 Tajikistan Cup: 2016, 2022
 Tajik Supercup: 2015, 2016, 2020, 2021, 2022

Sriwijaya
 East Kalimantan Governor Cup: 2018
 Piala Presiden third place: 2018
Persebaya Surabaya
 Indonesia President's Cup runner-up: 2019

Individual
 Tajik Top Scorer: 2015, 2016, 2021, 2022
 Tajik Player of the year: 2015, 2016
 AFC Cup Most Valuable Player: 2017
 Indonesia President's Cup Top Goalscorer: 2019 (shared)

References

External links
 
 
 

1990 births
Living people
Tajikistani footballers
Tajikistan international footballers
Tajikistani expatriate footballers
Expatriate footballers in Russia
Expatriate footballers in Indonesia
Tajikistani expatriate sportspeople in Russia
Tajikistani expatriate sportspeople in Indonesia
FC Istiklol players
FC Lokomotiv Moscow players
Sriwijaya F.C. players
Persebaya Surabaya players
Liga 1 (Indonesia) players
Association football forwards
FC Neftekhimik Nizhnekamsk players
Tajikistan Higher League players
Tajikistan youth international footballers